The Department of State Development was a former department of the Government of South Australia. The department was created by the Weatherill government on 1 July 2014 out of the former DFEEST, Department for Manufacturing, Innovation, Trade, Resources and Energy and select groups from a few other agencies, including Arts South Australia.

By 2019, under the Marshall government (elected 2018), most of its functions had been taken over by the Department for Innovation and Skills.

References

External links
 Government of South Australia gateway website
 Department of State Development

State
2014 establishments in Australia
South Australia
South Australia